A basis of accounting is the time various financial transactions are recorded. The cash basis (EU VAT vocabulary cash accounting) and the accrual basis are the two primary methods of tracking income and expenses in accounting. 

Both can be used in a range of situations, from the accounts of a whole country or a large corporation to those of a small business or an individual. In many cases, regulatory bodies require individuals, businesses or corporations to use one method or the other. When this is not the case, the choice of which to use is an important decision, as both methods have advantages and disadvantages.

Accrual basis
The accrual method records income items when they are earned and records deductions when expenses are incurred. For a business invoicing for an item sold, or work done, the corresponding amount will appear in the books even though no payment has yet been received, and debts owed by the business show as they are incurred, even though they may not be paid until much later. 

In the United States tax environment, the accrual basis has been an option since 1916. An "accrual basis taxpayer" looks to the "all-events test" and "earlier-of test" to determine when income is earned. Under the all-events test, an accrual basis taxpayer generally must include income "for the taxable year when all the events have occurred which fix the right to receive such income and the amount thereof can be determined with reasonable accuracy". Under the "earlier-of test", an accrual basis taxpayer receives income when (1) the required performance occurs, (2) payment therefor is due, or (3) payment therefor is made, whichever happens earliest. Under the earlier of test outlined in Revenue Ruling 74–607, an accrual basis taxpayer may be treated as a cash basis taxpayer when payment is received before the required performance and before the payment is actually due. An accrual basis taxpayer generally can claim a deduction "in the taxable year in which all the events have occurred that establish the fact of the liability, the amount of the liability can be determined with reasonable accuracy, and economic performance has occurred with respect to the liability".

Similar definition of accrual basis accounting is true for financial accounting purposes, except that revenue cannot be recognized until it is earned, even if a cash payment has already been received by the tax authorities.

See also Artnell Company v. Commissioner, U.S. tax ruling on treatment of prepayments.

Modified cash basis 
Also referred to as the modified cash basis, combines elements of both accrual and cash basis accounting. The modified method records income when it is earned but deductions when expenses are paid out. The recording of income is then of accrual basis, while the recording of expenses is cash basis. The modified method does not conform to the GAAP.

See also
 Accrual
 Adjusting entries
 Claim of right doctrine
 Deferral
 Matching principle
 Revenue recognition
 Tax accounting

References 

 HOA Accounting and Financial Statements Overview
 Personal taxes
 Corporate taxation in the United States
Corporate taxation in Canada
 Accounting systems
 Economics comparisons
 Accounting terminology